The Mid-American Conference gymnastics championships is the conference championship meet for women's gymnastics in the Mid-American Conference, a Division I member of the National Collegiate Athletic Association (NCAA).  All conference members qualify for the championship meet, which is held in three rounds.  The tournament began in 1981 and is rotated between the home arenas of the seven conference members. Through the 2021 championship, Central Michigan has won the most championships with 16, followed by Kent State with 12.

History and format
The championship was organized in 1981 after the Mid-American Conference added women's gymnastics as a sponsored sport. The NCAA began sponsoring women's gymnastics as a sport in 1981 and held the first championship tournament in 1982. Prior to 1981, most MAC member schools had women's gymnastics teams who competed in the Division for Girls' and Women's Sports (DGWS), which staged its first national championship in 1968. The DGWS later became the Association for Intercollegiate Athletics for Women (AIAW) in 1973. Teams also participated in regional and state-level championship meets, such as the Ohio Association of Intercollegiate Sports for Women and the Midwest Association of Intercollegiate Athletics for Women. Many of the programs were founded in the mid-1970s as a result of Title IX, though some programs originated earlier as clubs, such as Kent State in 1959.

The first MAC championship meet was hosted by Kent State University on March 21, 1981, in the Gymnastics Center at Memorial Gym and included the seven current members of the conference who sponsor women's gymnastics. Initially, eight conference members sponsored women's gymnastics, though Miami University was only able to participate in the 1982 championship meet and dropped the sport after the 1982–83 season. Northern Illinois University left the conference in 1986, reducing conference women's gymnastics membership to six teams, which stood until NIU returned to the conference for the 1997–98 season. The championship is rotated every year to the home arenas of the different member schools, so each school hosts every eighth year under the current format. At the meet, each team competes in four rotations: balance beam, uneven bars, vault, and floor exercise. In addition to the team champions, the conference recognizes an all-around winner and individual winners for each rotation. The team champion is awarded a regional berth in the NCAA Women's Gymnastics Championships.

By year
The following is a list of conference champions, individual all-around winners, and championship locations listed by year.

By school
The following table lists all teams that have been part of the championship, the years they have participated, and the years the respective program has won the team championship.

References

External links

Mid-American Conference Gymnastics Championship